Klub malega nogometa Sevnica, commonly referred to as KMN Sevnica, is a futsal club from Sevnica, Slovenia.

Honours
Slovenian Championship
 Winners: 1997–98

Slovenian Second Division
 Winners: 2003–04, 2006–07, 2021–22

References

External links
Official website 
UEFA profile

Sevnica
Futsal clubs in Slovenia
Futsal clubs established in 1996
1996 establishments in Slovenia